This is a list of people who made transformative breakthroughs in the creation, development and imagining of what computers could do.

Pioneers 
 To arrange the list either chronologically by year or alphabetically by person (ascending or descending), click that column's small "up-down" icon.

~ Items marked with a tilde are circa dates.

See also

 Computer Pioneer Award
 IEEE John von Neumann Medal
 Grace Murray Hopper Award
 History of computing
 History of computing hardware
 History of computing hardware (1960s–present)
History of software
 List of computer science awards
 List of computer scientists
 List of Internet pioneers
 List of people considered father or mother of a field § Computing
 ''The Man Who Invented the Computer (2010 book)
 List of Russian IT developers
 List of Women in Technology International Hall of Fame inductees
 Timeline of computing
 Turing Award
 Women in computing

References

Sources

External links
 Internet pioneers

Pioneers
Computer, List